Kuybyshev or Kuibyshev may refer to:

People
Valerian Kuybyshev (1888–1935), Russian revolutionary
Nikolay Kuibyshev (Kuybyshev) (1893–1938), Russian Red Army Komkor; brother of Valerian

Places
Several places in the Soviet Union were named after the Bolshevik revolutionary Valerian Kuybyshev.

Armenia
Kuybyshev, Armenia, a town in the Lori Province, now named Urasar
Kuybyshev, in 1940–1992, name of Haghartsin, a town in Tavush Province

Azerbaijan
Kuybışev, former name of Aran, Aghjabadi, a village in the Aghjabadi Rayon
Kuybyshev, former name of Ölcələr, a village in Imishli Rayon

Russia
Kuybyshev, one of the largest cities in the Russian SFSR in the old Soviet Union, restored to its former name of Samara in 1991 and currently the 8th largest city in Russia. 
Kuybyshev Oblast, name of Samara Oblast in 1936–1990
Kuybyshev Reservoir (or Kuybyshev Sea), a reservoir in Russia; the largest in Europe
Kuybyshev, Russia, several inhabited localities in Russia
Kuybyshev Urban Settlement, a municipal formation into which the Town of Kuybyshev in Kuybyshevsky District of Novosibirsk Oblast is incorporated

Tajikistan
Kuybyshev, alternative name of Kuybyshevsk, a location in Khatlon Province, Tajikistan

Other uses
Valerian Kuybyshev-class motorship, a class of Russian river passenger ships
Valerian Kuybyshev (ship) (1975), a Soviet/Russian river cruise ship of that class, cruising in the Volga–Neva basin
Kuybyshev Railway, a subsidiary of the Russian Railways headquartered in Samara, Russia
Kuybyshev Hydroelectric Station, former name of Zhiguli Hydroelectric Station

See also
Kuybyshevsky (disambiguation)
Kuybyshevo (disambiguation)
 Kubitschek (disambiguation)